Katharbatcha Muthuramalingam is an Indian politician and member of the Tamil Nadu Legislative Assembly representing Ramanathapuram constituency. He is a member of Dravida Munnetra Kazhagam and its district secretary of Ramanathapuram district.

Early life 
He is the son of former Dravida Munnetra Kazhagam(DMK) MLA Thiru Kadher Batcha vellaichamy and Rukmani Ammal.

Political life 
He served as Melaramanathi village  Panchayat union president for 20 years from 1996 to 2016 Consecutive Four times.

He has been elected as a member of Tamil Nadu Legislative Assembly from Ramanathapuram (state assembly constituency) in the 2021 Tamil Nadu Legislative Assembly election with 51.88% of the vote. He is a first time member of the legislative assembly.

He is the  Member of the Public Institutional Committee for the year 2021–2022.

He appointed as Non Official member of Sixth State finance commission.

References

Dravida Munnetra Kazhagam politicians
1972 births
Living people
Tamil Nadu MLAs 2021–2026